Jules Deneumoulin (11 May 1910 – 25 November 2006) was a Belgian sprint canoeist who competed in the late 1930s.

He finished 13th and last in the folding K-1 10000 m event at the 1936 Summer Olympics in Berlin.

References
Sports-reference.com profile
Jules Deneumoulin's obituary

1910 births
2006 deaths
Belgian male canoeists
Canoeists at the 1936 Summer Olympics
Olympic canoeists of Belgium
20th-century Belgian people